The canton of Vouziers is an administrative division of the Ardennes department, northern France. Its borders were modified at the French canton reorganisation which came into effect in March 2015. Its seat is in Vouziers.

It consists of the following communes:

Angecourt
Artaise-le-Vivier
Authe
Autruche
Bairon-et-ses-Environs
Ballay
Bar-lès-Buzancy
Bayonville
Belleville-et-Châtillon-sur-Bar
Belval-Bois-des-Dames
La Berlière
La Besace
Boult-aux-Bois
Brieulles-sur-Bar
Briquenay
Bulson
Buzancy
Chémery-Chéhéry
La Croix-aux-Bois
Fossé
Germont
Les Grandes-Armoises
Haraucourt
Harricourt
Imécourt
Landres-et-Saint-Georges
Maisoncelle-et-Villers
Le Mont-Dieu
Montgon
La Neuville-à-Maire
Noirval
Nouart
Oches
Les Petites-Armoises
Quatre-Champs
Raucourt-et-Flaba
Remilly-Aillicourt
Saint-Pierremont
Sauville
Sommauthe
Stonne
Sy
Tailly
Tannay
Thénorgues
Toges
Vandy
Vaux-en-Dieulet
Verpel
Verrières
Vouziers

References

Cantons of Ardennes (department)